Joyce Vincent Wilson (born December 14, 1946 in Detroit, Michigan) is an American singer, best known as part of the group Tony Orlando and Dawn.

Wilson began her career in Detroit providing background vocals on Motown and Golden World recordings. She met Telma Hopkins during this time and the two provided background vocals at Holland–Dozier–Holland's Invictus/Hot Wax Records.

Orlando released the singles "Candida" and "Knock Three Times", recorded with session vocalists Linda November and Toni Wine backing him, under the name Dawn; when the singles charted, Orlando found himself needing to assemble an actual backing group to tour and record with. Wilson and Telma Hopkins became the fully embodied Dawn. The popular 1970s group later had their own successful television program (Tony Orlando and Dawn), and Wilson was featured on hit singles like "He Don't Love You (Like I Love You)", "Tie a Yellow Ribbon Round the Ole Oak Tree" and "Mornin' Beautiful".

In 1977, Wilson was offered a chance to replace original Supremes member Mary Wilson in the Supremes, with members Scherrie Payne and Susaye Greene, before Motown determined that the group should not continue without any original members.  Wilson sang as a backing vocalist on Payne and Greene's duet album Partners in 1979, which was originally conceived as a Supremes album.

A friend of Payne, Wilson has also provided backing vocals during her solo concerts. In 2006, Wilson and her sister Pamela Vincent provided backing vocals at the twentieth anniversary concert of the Former Ladies of the Supremes. In January 2007, both Wilson and Vincent provided backing vocals for Payne at a concert in Los Angeles, California. Wilson and Vincent also perform with the "Inspirational Voices of Free" choir, and we also members of the short-lived supergroup Tour de 4Force. This 5-piece group included Jim Gilstrap, Theresa Davis (of The Emotions) and Scherrie Payne.

In April 2007, Wilson stepped in as a last-minute replacement for Freddi Poole, who was unable to join her group the Former Ladies of the Supremes, on a tour of Japan.  In June 2008, Wilson stepped in to replace Lynda Lawrence on a tour of England. Then in September 2009, Wilson permanently replaced Freddi Poole as a member of the Former Ladies of the Supremes group, which until 2017 was billed as Scherrie Payne and Lynda Laurence Formerly of The Supremes. Following Laurence's departure, the group, now featuring former Supreme Susaye Greene alongside Payne and Wilson, is billed as Scherrie & Susaye Formerly of The Supremes.

References

External links
 

1946 births
Living people
20th-century African-American women singers
American women pop singers
Tony Orlando and Dawn members
Singers from Detroit
21st-century African-American people
21st-century African-American women